Jacob Goodall (born April 30, 1997) is an American soccer player who plays for Greenville Triumph in the USL League One.

Career

Youth, college and amateur
Goodall attended Xavier University in 2015 to play college soccer, where over four seasons, he made 69 appearances, scoring 2 goals and tallying 10 assists for the Musketeers. Goodall redshirted in 2015, but went on to be named Big East All-Academic Team in 2016 and 2017.

Whilst at college, Goodall also appeared in the USL PDL with IMG Academy Bradenton in 2016 and Cincinnati Dutch Lions in 2018.

Following college, Goodall spent time with OVPL side Kings Hammer FC in 2020, scoring 1 goals and tallying 5 assists in 8 appearances.

Professional
On March 23, 2021, Goodall signed with Greenville Triumph of USL League One. He made his professional debut on May 8, 2021, appearing as a 89th-minute substitute during a 2–1 win over North Carolina FC.

References

External links 
 
 Xavier University profile

1997 births
American soccer players
Association football defenders
Cincinnati Dutch Lions players
Greenville Triumph SC players
IMG Academy Bradenton players
Living people
People from Brandon, Florida
Soccer players from Florida
USL League One players
USL League Two players
Xavier Musketeers men's soccer players